is a former Japanese football player.

Playing career
Mizuhara was born in Heguri, Nara on January 15, 1975. After graduating from high school, he joined Nagoya Grampus Eight in 1993. On March 25, 1995, he debuted as substitutes against Júbilo Iwata. However he could only play this match behind Yuji Ito until 1998. In 1999, he moved to Japan Football League (JFL) club Honda and played many matches. In 2000, he moved to JFL club Yokohama FC. He played as regular goalkeeper. The club won the champions in 2000 and was promoted to J2 League from 2001. In 2004, he moved to J1 League club Tokyo Verdy. On May 14, 2005, he played against Kashiwa Reysol in J1 League instead Yoshinari Takagi who was suspended. This match was his match in J1 for the first time in 10 years. However he could hardly play in the match behind Takagi in 3 seasons until 2006. In 2007, he moved to Regional Leagues club New Wave Kitakyushu (later Giravanz Kitakyushu). He played as regular goalkeeper and the club was promoted to JFL in 2008 and J2 in 2010. However he lost position in 2011 behind Yuya Sato who came the club in 2011. In 2012, Mizuhara moved to JFL club Kamatamare Sanuki. In February, he announced his retirement. However he joined Prefectural Leagues club Veertien Kuwana in May 2013 and he played for the club in 1 season.

Club statistics

References

External links

1975 births
Living people
Association football people from Nara Prefecture
Japanese footballers
J1 League players
J2 League players
Japan Football League players
Nagoya Grampus players
Honda FC players
Yokohama FC players
Tokyo Verdy players
Giravanz Kitakyushu players
Kamatamare Sanuki players
Veertien Mie players
Association football goalkeepers